In enzymology, a methylglyoxal reductase (NADH-dependent) is an enzyme that catalyzes the chemical reaction

(R)-lactaldehyde + NAD+  methylglyoxal + NADH + H+

Thus, the two substrates of this enzyme are (R)-lactaldehyde and NAD+, whereas its 3 products are methylglyoxal, NADH, and H+.

This enzyme belongs to the family of oxidoreductases, specifically those acting on the CH-OH group of donor with NAD+ or NADP+ as acceptor. The systematic name of this enzyme class is (R)-lactaldehyde:NAD+ oxidoreductase. Other names in common use include methylglyoxal reductase, and D-lactaldehyde dehydrogenase.  This enzyme participates in pyruvate metabolism.

References

 

EC 1.1.1
NADH-dependent enzymes
Enzymes of unknown structure